Crag is an unincorporated community in Greenbrier County, West Virginia, United States.

The community was named for the rocky crags near the town site.

References

Unincorporated communities in Greenbrier County, West Virginia
Unincorporated communities in West Virginia